"So help me God" is a phrase often used to give an oath, and most commonly optional as part of an oath of office. It is also used in some jurisdictions as a form of oath for other forms of public duty, such as an appearance in court, service as a juror, etc.

The essence of the phrase is to emphasize that one means what one is saying or has said. It therefore implies greater care than usual in the act of the performance of one's duty, such as in testimony to the facts of the matter in a court of law.  It also implies a greater degree of seriousness and obligation than is usually assigned to common conversation.

Australia
In Australia the Oath of Allegiance is available in two forms, only one of which contains the phrase "So help me God!"

Canada
In Canada, the Oath of Office, Oath of Allegiance, and Oath of Members of the Privy Council may be sworn, and end in "So help me God." They may also be solemnly affirmed, and in such case the phrase is omitted.

Fiji
The Constitution of Fiji, Chapter 17 requires this phrase for the oath of allegiance, and before service to the republic from the President's office or Vice-President's office, a ministerial position, or a judicial position.

New Zealand
In New Zealand the Oath of Allegiance is available in English or Maori in two forms, one an oath containing the phrase 'so help me God' and the other an affirmation which does not.  The Police Act 1958 and the Oaths Modernisation Bill still includes the phrase.

United Kingdom
The Oath of Allegiance set out in the Promissory Oaths Act 1868 ends with this phrase, and is required to be taken by various office-holders.

United States
The phrase "So help me God" is prescribed in oaths as early as the Judiciary Act of 1789, for U.S. officers other than the President. The act makes the semantic distinction between an affirmation and an oath. The oath, religious in essence, includes the phrase "so help me God" and "[I] swear". The affirmation uses "[I] affirm". Both serve the same purpose and are described as one (i.e. "... solemnly swear, or affirm, that ...") 

In the United States, the No Religious Test Clause states that "no religious test shall ever be required as a qualification to any office or public trust under the United States."

Presidential oath

There is no law that requires Presidents to add the words "So help me God" at the end of the oath (or to use a Bible).  Some historians maintain that George Washington himself added the phrase to the end of his first oath, setting a precedent for future presidents and continuing what was already established practice in his day and that all Presidents since have used this phrase, according to Marvin Pinkert, executive director of the National Archives Experience. Many other historians reject this story given that "it was not until 65 years after the event that the story that Washington added this phrase first appeared in a published volume" and other witnesses, who were present for the event, did not cite him as having added the phrase. These historians further note that "we have no convincing contemporary evidence that any president said "so help me God" until September 1881, when Chester A. Arthur took the oath after the death of James Garfield." It is demonstrable, however, that those historians are in error regarding their claim that there is no "contemporary evidence" of a president saying "so help me God" until 1881. An eyewitness reporter to Lincoln's second inaugural in 1865 clearly observed Lincoln saying the phrase.

Oath of citizenship
The United States Oath of Citizenship (officially referred to as the "Oath of Allegiance", 8 C.F.R. Part 337 (2008)), taken by all immigrants who wish to become United States citizens, includes the phrase "so help me God"; however  provides that the phrase is optional.

Military
The Enlistment oath and officer's Oath of Office both contain this phrase. Normally, it is not required to be said if the speaker has a personal or moral objection, as is true of all oaths administered by the United States government. However, a change in October 2013 to Air Force Instruction 36-2606 made it mandatory to include the phrase during Air Force enlistments/reenlistments. This change has made the instruction "consistent with the language mandated in 10 USC 502". The Air Force announced on September 17, 2014, that it revoked this previous policy change, allowing anyone to omit "so help me God" from the oath.

State laws

Some of the states have specified that the words "so help me God" were used in oath of office, and also required of jurors, witnesses in court, notaries public, and state employees.  Where this is still the case, there is the possibility of a court challenge over eligibility, as the U.S. Supreme Court ruled in Torcaso v. Watkins, 367 U.S. 488 (1961), that such state-law requirements violate citizens' rights under the federal Constitution.
Alabama, Connecticut, Delaware, Kentucky, Louisiana, Maine, Massachusetts, Mississippi, New Mexico, North Carolina, Texas, and Virginia retain the required "so help me God" as part of the oath to public office. Historically, Maryland and South Carolina did include it but both have been successfully challenged in court. Other states, such as New Hampshire, North Dakota and Rhode Island allow exceptions or alternative phrases. In Wisconsin, the specific language of the oath has been repealed.

Equivalent in other languages

Croatian
In Croatia, the text of presidential oath, which is defined by the Presidential Elections Act amendments of 1997 (Article 4), ends with "Tako mi Bog pomogao" (So help me God). 

In 2009, concerns about the phrase infringing on Constitution of Croatia were raised. Constitutional Court of Croatia ruled them out in 2017, claiming that it is compatible with constitution and secular state. The court said the phrase is in neither direct nor indirect relation to any religious beliefs of the  elected president. It doesn't represent a theist or religious belief and does not stop the president in any way from expressing any other religious belief. Saying the phrase while taking the presidential oath does not force a certain belief on the President and does not infringe on their religious freedoms.

Filipino
In the Oath of Office of the President of the Philippines, the phrase "So help me God" (Filipino: Kasihan nawâ akó ng Diyos) is mandatory, though the phrase can be omitted voluntarily, in which case it would become an affirmation instead of an oath. An affirmation, however, has exactly the same legal effect as an oath.

French
In medieval France, tradition held that when the Duke of Brittany or other royalty entered the city of Rennes, they would proclaim Et qu'ainsi Dieu me soit en aide ("And so help me God").

German
Germany
The phrase So wahr mir Gott helfe (literally "as true as God may help me") is an optional part in oaths of office prescribed for civil servants, soldiers, judges as well as members and high representatives of the federal and state governments such as the Federal President, Federal Chancellor and the Minister Presidents. Parties and witnesses in criminal and civil proceedings may also be placed under oath with this phrase. In such proceedings, the judge first speaks the words You swear [by God Almighty and All-Knowing] that to the best of your knowledge you have spoken the pure truth and not concealed anything. The witness or party then must answer I swear it [, so help me God]. The words between brackets are added or omitted according to the preference of the person placed under oath. If the person concerned raises a conscientious objection against any kind of oath, the judge may speak the words Aware of your responsibility in court, you affirm that to the best of your knowledge you have spoken the pure truth and not concealed anything to which the person needs to reply Yes. Both forms of the oath and the affirmation carry the same penalty, if the person is found to have lied. Contrary to the oath without a religious phrase, this kind of affirmation is not necessarily available outside court proceedings (e.g. for an oath of office).

Austria
The traditional oath of witnesses in Austrian courts ends with the phrase so wahr mir Gott helfe. There are, however, exemptions for witnesses of different religious denominations as well as those unaffiliated with any religion. The oath is rarely practised in civil trials and was completely abolished for criminal procedures in 2008. The phrase so wahr mir Gott helfe is also an (optional) part in the oath of surveyors who testify as expert witnesses as well as court-certified interpreters. Unlike in Germany, the phrase so wahr mir Gott helfe is not part of the oath of office of the Federal President, members of the federal government or state governors, who may or may not add a religious affirmation after the form of oath prescribed by the constitution.

Polish
The Polish phrase is "" or "." It has been used in most version of the Polish Army oaths, however other denominations use different phrases.

Romanian
In Romania, the oath translation is "Așa să-mi ajute Dumnezeu!", which is used in various ceremonies such as the ministers' oath in front of the president of the republic or the magistrates' oath.

References 

Oaths
Religious language
Religion in the United States
Religion and politics